PT. Mazda Motor Indonesia was an official distributor company of the Mazda Motor Corporation from 2006 to 2017. It was preceded by the former joint venture between the Mazda Motor Corporation and the Indomobil Group, PT. National Motors. The company is located in Jakarta, Indonesia and has once built two different Mazda Familia based car models. The manufacturing company and joint venture with Indomobil Group was founded in 1985 and discontinued in 1997. The PA monthly production of approximately 1,500 units were planned.

The new successor to PT. National Motors is PT. Mazda Motor Indonesia, which is directly owned by Mazda Motor Corporation. The company is founded on April 27, 2006. By 2015, the main profit of the company comes majorly from the Mazda CX-5 (48%) and Mazda2 (32%).

On February 1, 2017, the distribution of Mazda vehicles were taken over by Eurokars Group, announced on October 14, 2016.

Former models 
 Mazda 323 (1977-1980)
 Mazda MR90 (1990–1993)
 Mazda Baby Boomer (1993–1995)
 Mazda Vantrend (1992–1997)
 Mazda 626 (1987–1992)
 Mazda 323 (1989–1994)
 Mazda Cronos (1992–1997)
 Mazda Lantis (1994–1997)
 Mazda E2000 (1996–2005)
 Mazda Familia (1997–2000)
 Mazda Premacy (2000–2005)
 Mazda MPV (2000–2003)
 Mazda 323 Protegé (2003)
 Mazda B2500 (2003–2007)
 Mazda Tribute (2002–2008)
 Mazda5 (2007–2010)
 Mazda CX-7 (2007–2012)
 Mazda8 (2011–2016)
 Mazda Biante (2012–2018)
 Mazda VX-1 (2013–2017)
 Mazda BT-50 (2007–2019)

References

Car manufacturers of Indonesia
Mazda
Companies based in Jakarta
Vehicle manufacturing companies established in 1985
Indonesian companies established in 1985

de:IndoMobil Group#Mazda Motor Indonesia, PT.